Creu de Santos or Xàquera is the highest mountain of the Serra de Cardó range, Catalonia, Spain. The Serra de Cardó is part of the Massís de Cardó, Catalan Pre-Coastal Range. This mountain has an elevation of 941 metres above sea level.

See also
Cardó Massif
Catalan Pre-Coastal Range

References

Mountains of Catalonia
Emblematic summits of Catalonia